Dhaka (originally called Thaka) is traditional hand made fabric of the indigenous Limbu people  of eastern Nepal. It is a kind of pattern that  is originally hand made which is gaining popularity in all cultures and around the world. It has its origins in Terhathum districtTaplejung district of Nepal. The art of making dhaka is taught by one generation to another. Dhaka fabric represents Limbu cultural dress. Limbu man wear clad in dhaka topi (hat) and scarf, and a Limbu woman in dhaka mekhli, shawl and shari.

References

Nepalese culture